Wilhelm Abeln (2 June 189417 May 1969) was a German farmer and politician. He was a representative of the German Christian Democratic Union and a member of the appointed regional parliament in Oldenburg from its first session on 30 January 1946 until its last session on 6 November 1946.

See also
List of German Christian Democratic Union politicians

References

1894 births
1969 deaths
People from Cloppenburg (district)
People from the Grand Duchy of Oldenburg
Christian Democratic Union of Germany politicians